Albert Reinhold Carmichael (November 10, 1928 – September 7, 2019) was an American football player.

Carmichael holds the distinction of scoring the first touchdown in American Football League history, a 59-yard pass reception from Frank Tripucka for the Broncos against the Boston Patriots on September 9, 1960.

High school career
Carmichael prepped at Gardena High School.

College career
Following a three-year enlistment in the Marine Corps - he also played for the El Toro Marines, gaining about 1,000 yards in each of two years at the El Toro Marine Air Corps Station  - Carmichael played one year of college football at Santa Ana Junior College.  At Santa Ana, he rushed for 1,110 yards with 19 TDs to earn Little All-American honors and was on a Junior Rose Bowl squad. Carmichael then played at the University of Southern California (USC).  As a Trojan, he was a three-year letter winner (1950-51-52), leading the team in rushing as a sophomore and in kick returns as a senior. At USC he scored the winning touchdown in the 1953 Rose Bowl against Wisconsin.  Carmichael caught a third quarter pass from back-up quarterback Rudy Bukich to win the game, 7–0.

Professional career
Carmichael played for the Green Bay Packers of the National Football League between 1953 and 1958; then he was with the Denver Broncos of the American Football League in 1960 and 1961.  He twice led pro football in kick off return yards.  He scored the first touchdown in American Football League history, a 59-yard pass reception from Frank Tripucka for the Broncos against the Boston Patriots on September 9, 1960. He also has the tenth longest play in NFL history, a 106-yard kick off return for touchdown, at the time an NFL record held until 2007. When he retired, Carmichael was the NFL's all-time leader in kickoff return yardage.

Following his playing career, Carmichael was inducted into the Green Bay Packers, Santa Ana College, All-Services and Orange County Halls of Fame.

Stunt double
Carmichael was a stuntman in more than 50 films, including Jim Thorpe – All-American (1951) for Burt Lancaster (1951), Saturday's Hero (1951), All-American (1953), Pork Chop Hill (1959), It Started with a Kiss (1959), The Big Operator, Elmer Gantry (1960), one of the doubles for Kirk Douglas in Spartacus (1960), Birdman of Alcatraz (1962), Son of Flubber (1962), smf How the West was Won (1962), and the TV show Rawhide.

Family
Carmichael married Jan and they had three children Chris, Pam, and Stacy. He lived in Orange County working in the pool-cleaning and automobile businesses before moving to Palm Desert to sell real estate in 1984.

See also
 List of American Football League players

References

External links
106 Yards ~ Al Carmichael's autobiography

1928 births
2019 deaths
People from Palm Desert, California
Players of American football from California
Players of American football from Boston
American football halfbacks
American football return specialists
Santa Ana Dons football players
USC Trojans football players
Green Bay Packers players
Denver Broncos (AFL) players
American stunt performers
Stunt doubles
Gardena High School alumni
Sportspeople from Riverside County, California